"Neighborhood #1 (Tunnels)" is a song by Canadian rock band Arcade Fire, and the first track on their debut album Funeral. It is the first of the four-part "Neighborhood" series found on Funeral. It was the band's first single, released several months before the album as a 7" vinyl record on June 20, 2004, to a pressing of 1500 copies. The B-side to the album is a recording of the song "My Buddy" by swing musician Alvino Rey. Rey is the maternal grandfather of Arcade Fire members Win and William Butler.

Arcade Fire re-issued the single on November 29, 2019 as part of Record Store Day's Black Friday event.

Critical reception

In August 2009, the song was named #10 on Pitchfork's "Top 500 Tracks of the 2000s". In a 2012 Beats Per Minute article on The Essential Arcade Fire, it was named the band's most essential track by writer Lucien Flores. Flores writes, "'Tunnels' has all the elements of a great Arcade Fire song: a head-bobbing rhythm section, lyrics that harken back to an imperfect past, a seamless blend of instruments, and a cathartic coda."

Track listing
7" single
"Neighborhood #1 (Tunnels)" - 4:48
"My Buddy" (Alvino Rey Orchestra, live radio broadcast, 1940) - 2:32

Personnel

Arcade Fire 
Win Butler - vocals, electric guitar
Regine Chassagne - backing vocals, drums
Richard Reed Parry - piano, backing vocals, organ, engineer, recording
Tim Kingsbury - bass, backing vocals
Howard Bilerman - electric guitar, engineer, recording
Will Butler - percussion, backing vocals
Additional musicians
Sarah Neufeld – violin, string arrangements
Owen Pallett – violin, string arrangements
Michael Olsen – cello
Pietro Amato – horn
Anita Fust – harp

References

External links
Merge Records: Arcade Fire Discography

2004 debut singles
Arcade Fire songs
Merge Records singles
2004 songs
Songs written by William Butler (musician)
Songs written by Win Butler
Songs written by Régine Chassagne
Songs written by Tim Kingsbury
Songs written by Richard Reed Parry